Mississippi Mills was a cotton and wool textile manufacturing complex that operated in Wesson, Mississippi, during the latter half of the 19th century.  By 1892, Mississippi Mills was described as the largest industry of its kind in the South.

Absentee management and financial difficulties contributed to the mills' decline.  The complex closed in 1910 and was dismantled several years later.

Establishment 
In 1864, during the American Civil War, a textile mill in Bankston, Mississippi, was burned by Union forces because it supplied the Confederate Army.  In 1866, the Bankston mill owner, Colonel James Madison Wesson, relocated to Copiah County, Mississippi, and established a new textile mill, known as the Mississippi Manufacturing Company.  The town of Wesson developed around the mill.

Because of Reconstruction-era financial problems, Mississippi Manufacturing Co. was bankrupt by 1871. Captain William Oliver and John T. Hardy bought the mill from Col. Wesson, but it burned in 1873.  Oliver convinced Mississippi's largest landowner and cotton producer, Edmund Richardson, to become a partner in building a more modern textile mill of brick, to reduce the fire hazard created by using wood-fired power in combination with flammable cotton fibers.  Richardson bought out Hardy and assumed a controlling interest in the enterprise, which became known as Mississippi Mills, with Edmund Richardson as president and William Oliver as general manager.

Peak years 
The textile complex consisted of four mills that were built over a period of 21 years, from 1873 to 1894.  By 1882, electric lights had been installed to illuminate the textile buildings.  When all four mills were completed, they covered several city blocks, and one was five stories high.

Under the leadership of William Oliver, from 1873 to 1891, business at Mississippi Mills thrived because of his interest in the mill workers and community affairs.  By the late 1880s, Mississippi Mills employed:   Mississippi Mills produced a great variety of cotton and woolen products that included:

Decline 
Following the deaths of Edmund Richardson, in 1886, and William Oliver, in 1891, the fortunes of Mississippi Mills began to decline. John Richardson, who succeeded his father as president, brought in a general manager from the North, while he himself moved to New Orleans, Louisiana.  Mississippi Mills was further handicapped by the Panic of 1893, increased transportation costs, a drop in cotton prices, and labor disputes. In 1906, Mississippi Mills was forced into receivership and the facility closed in 1910. The buildings stood vacant until they were dismantled in 1920.

References 

Buildings and structures in Copiah County, Mississippi
History of Mississippi
Cotton mills in the United States
1910 disestablishments in Mississippi
Buildings and structures completed in 1866
1866 establishments in Mississippi
Wool trade